The Niagara Falls Convention Centre is a convention centre located in Niagara Falls, Ontario, Canada, along Stanley Avenue and Dunn Street. It was previously known as the Scotiabank Convention Centre from 2011 to 2021 and was renamed after Scotiabank's naming rights expired.

History 
In 2007, a public-private partnership was formed to fund the project. Both the federal and provincial governments contributed $35 million each, and the remaining one-third commitment came from private investors. The Regional Municipality of Niagara provided the lease of land on which the facility was built for a nominal fee of $1 per year.

Construction on the two-storey building began on May 1, 2009. The halfway point of construction was marked by a ceremony on April 30, 2010.

See also 
 Scotiabank Arena
 Scotiabank Saddledome
 Meridian Centre – located in nearby St. Catharines

References 

Convention centres in Canada
Buildings and structures in Niagara Falls, Ontario
Buildings and structures completed in 2011
2011 establishments in Ontario